1 Thessalonians 5 is the fifth (and the last) chapter of the First Epistle to the Thessalonians in the New Testament of the Christian Bible. It is authored by Paul the Apostle, likely written in Corinth in about 50-51 CE for the church in Thessalonica. This chapter contains a message about Christ's second coming, and various final exhortations and greetings.

Text
The original text was written in Koine Greek. This chapter is divided into 28 verses.

Textual witnesses
Some early manuscripts containing the text of this chapter are:
Papyrus 46 (~200; extant verses 5, 23–28)
Papyrus 30 (3rd century; extant verses: 1–18, 25–28)
Codex Vaticanus (325–350)
Codex Sinaiticus (330–360)
Uncial 0226 (5th century; extant verses: 1–3)
Codex Alexandrinus (400–440)
Codex Freerianus (~450; extant verses 1, 9–12, 23–27)
Codex Claromontanus (~550)

The need for wakefulness (5:1–11)

Paul reminds the Thessalonians that "the day of the Lord will come like a thief in the night" (verse 2), that is, quite unexpectedly, so they should be sober and put on "the breastplate of faith and love" and "the helmet of hope of salvation". According to the Jerusalem Bible, Paul asserts here that "he has no idea when the Last Day will come, and he merely repeats what the Lord said ... about having to stay awake until it comes".

Verse 2
 For you yourselves know perfectly that the day of the Lord so comes as a thief in the night.

"Know perfectly": as it was made plain and evident with high certainty to them either from the words of Jesus Christ, or from Paul's and his co-workers' teaching.
 "The day of the Lord": refers to the day when Jesus will reveal himself to be "King of kings, and Lord of lords, and the Judge of the whole earth", as he will appear in his glory. This is sometimes referred to as "the day of the Son of man" or "the day of God", also "the day of redemption" of the body from the grave from mortality, and "the last day" when resurrection of the dead will happen, as well as "the day of judgment", when Jesus Christ will come to judge "the quick (the living) and the dead".
 "Comes as a thief in the night": when people are unaware that the Lord himself in that day will come, not to the character of the thief, nor to the goal of his coming; but the sudden manner of it, when not thought of and looked for and least expected. Since the Thessalonians knew this full well, it was needless for the apostle to write about the time and season of it that it could no more be known and fixed, than the coming of a thief into any of their houses.

Verse 8
 But let us who are of the day be sober, putting on the breastplate of faith and love, and as a helmet the hope of salvation.
In this verse, Paul exposes the triad of faith, love and hope (in this specific order), which he introduced in 1 Thessalonians 1:3.
 "Putting on  the breastplate of faith and love, and as a helmet the hope of salvation": alluding to Isaiah 59:17:
"He put on (LXX: enedusato) righteousness as a breastplate (dikaiosunēn thōraka), and a helmet of salvation (perikephalaian sōtēriou) on His head" 
where Paul changes "the breastplate of righteousness" to "the breastplate of faith and love", and adds "hope" to "the helmet of salvation".

Verse 9
For God has not appointed us to wrath, but to obtain salvation by our Lord Jesus Christ,
"Appointed us to wrath": or "destine us for wrath", referring to 'the outpouring of God's wrath on the earth in the day of the Lord'.

Final Exhortations and Greetings (5:12–28)
This final section contains various pieces of advice, greetings, prayers, Paul's own handwriting and a closing benediction.

Verse 17
pray without ceasing
This verse is the basis of unceasing prayer as used in the Eastern Orthodox tradition of Hesychasm for practicing the Jesus Prayer.

Verse 27
I charge you by the Lord that this epistle be read to all the holy brethren.
The audience is referred to as "the brethren" or "the brothers" (τοῖς ἀδελφοῖς, tois adelphois) in critical texts; the word "holy" also appears in the Textus Receptus, and as "all the holy brethren" (omnibus sanctis fratribus) in the Latin Vulgate.

See also
 Jesus Christ
 Second Coming
 Related Bible parts: Isaiah 2, Isaiah 24, Isaiah 59, Joel 1, Joel 3, Zephaniah 1, Matthew 24, Revelation 19

Notes

References

Sources

External links
 King James Bible - Wikisource
English Translation with Parallel Latin Vulgate
Online Bible at GospelHall.org (ESV, KJV, Darby, American Standard Version, Bible in Basic English)
Multiple bible versions at Bible Gateway (NKJV, NIV, NRSV etc.)

05